Pellegrinia is a genus of flowering plants belonging to the family Ericaceae.

It is native to Colombia and Peru in western South America.
 
The genus name of Pellegrinia is in honour of François Pellegrin (1881–1965), a French botanist, who specialised in the plants of tropical Africa. 
It was first described and published in Notizbl. Bot. Gart. Berlin-Dahlem Vol.12 on page 287 in 1935.

Known species
According to Kew:
Pellegrinia coccinea 
Pellegrinia grandiflora 
Pellegrinia harmsiana 
Pellegrinia hirsuta

References

Ericaceae
Ericaceae genera
Plants described in 1935
Flora of Colombia
Flora of Peru